The third principal meridian begins at the mouth of the Ohio River and extends north to the northern boundary of the state of Illinois, and with the base line in latitude 38° 28′ 20″, governs the surveys in the state east of the third principal meridian, with the exception of those projected from the second principal meridian, and the surveys on the west, to the Illinois River. This meridian is nearly coincident with 89° 10′ 15″ of west longitude from Greenwich.

External links

Sources
 
 

3
Meridians (geography)